Kristine "Kristi" Tsuya Yamaguchi (born July 12, 1971) is an American former figure skater and author. In ladies' singles, Yamaguchi is the 1992 Olympic champion, a two-time World champion (1991 and 1992), and the 1992 U.S. champion. In 1992, she became the first Asian American woman to win a gold medal in a Winter Olympic competition. As a pairs skater with Rudy Galindo, she is the 1988 World Junior champion and a two-time national champion (1989 and 1990). In December 2005, she was inducted into the U.S. Olympic Hall of Fame. In 2008, Yamaguchi became the celebrity champion in the sixth season of Dancing with the Stars.

Early life 
Yamaguchi was born on July 12, 1971, in Hayward, California, to Jim Yamaguchi, a dentist, and Carole (née Doi), a medical secretary. Yamaguchi is Sansei (a third-generation descendant of Japanese emigrants). Her paternal grandparents and maternal great-grandparents emigrated to the United States from Japan, originating from Wakayama Prefecture and Saga Prefecture. Yamaguchi's grandparents were sent to an internment camp during World War II, where her mother was born. Her maternal grandfather, George A. Doi, was in the U.S. Army and fought in Germany and France during World War II during the time his family was interned at the Heart Mountain and Amache camps. Research done in 2010 by Harvard Professor Henry Louis Gates, Jr. for the PBS series Faces of America showed that Yamaguchi's heritage can be traced back to Wakayama and Saga prefectures in Japan and that her paternal grandfather, Tatsuichi Yamaguchi, emigrated to Hawaii in 1899.

Yamaguchi and her siblings, Brett and Lori, grew up in Fremont, California. In order to accommodate her training schedule, Yamaguchi was home-schooled for her first two years of high school, but attended Mission San Jose High School for her junior and senior years, where she graduated.  Yamaguchi was born with bi-lateral clubfoot, resulting in serial leg casting for most of the first year of her life followed by corrective shoes and bracing.

Competitive skating career 
Yamaguchi began skating and taking ballet lessons, as a child, as physical therapy for her club feet.

Pairs career 
With Rudy Galindo she won the junior title at the U.S. championships in 1986. Two years later, Yamaguchi won the singles and, with Galindo, the pairs titles at the 1988 World Junior Championships; Galindo had won the 1987 World Junior Championship in singles. In 1989 Yamaguchi and Galindo won the senior pairs title at the U.S. Championships. They won the title again in 1990.

As a pairs team, Yamaguchi and Galindo were unusual in that they were both accomplished singles skaters, which allowed them to consistently perform difficult elements like side by side triple flip jumps, which are still more difficult than side by side jumps performed by current top international pairs teams. They also jumped and spun in opposite directions, Yamaguchi counter-clockwise, and Galindo clockwise, which gave them an unusual look on the ice. In 1990, Yamaguchi decided to focus solely on singles. Galindo went on to have a successful singles career as well, winning the 1996 U.S. championships and the 1996 World bronze medal.

Singles career 

Yamaguchi won her first major international gold medal in figure skating at the 1990 Goodwill Games.

In 1991, Yamaguchi moved to Edmonton, Alberta, to train with coach Christy Ness. There, she took psychology courses at the University of Alberta. The same year, Yamaguchi placed second to Tonya Harding at the U.S. championships, her third consecutive silver medal at Nationals. The following month in Munich, Germany, Yamaguchi won the 1991 World Championships. That year, the American ladies team, consisting of Yamaguchi, Harding and Nancy Kerrigan, became the only national ladies team to have its members sweep the Worlds podium until the 2021 World Figure Skating Championships, when Anna Shcherbakova, Elizaveta Tuktamysheva and Alexandra Trusova swept the podium representing FSR.

In 1992, Yamaguchi won her first U.S. title and gained a spot to the 1992 Winter Olympics in Albertville, France. Joining her on the U.S. team were again Kerrigan and Harding. While Harding and Japan's Midori Ito were consistently landing the difficult triple Axel jump in competition, Yamaguchi instead focused on her artistry and her triple-triple combinations in hopes of becoming a more well-rounded skater. Both Harding and Ito fell on their triple Axels at the Olympics (though Ito successfully landed the jump later on in her long program after missing the first time), allowing Yamaguchi to win the gold, despite errors in her free program, including putting a hand to the ice on a triple loop and a double salchow instead of a planned triple. She later explained her mindset during the long program: “You just do your best and forget the rest." Yamaguchi went on to successfully defend her World title that same year.

Professional skating career 
Yamaguchi turned professional after the 1991–92 competitive season. She toured for many years with Stars on Ice and also participated in the pro competition circuit.

Public life and popular culture

Television 
Yamaguchi made a fitness video with the California Raisins in 1993 called "Hip to be Fit: The California Raisins and Kristi Yamaguchi". She has appeared as herself on Everybody Loves Raymond and in D2: The Mighty Ducks, Frosted Pink, and the Disney Channel original movie Go Figure. Yamaguchi has also performed in numerous television skating specials, including the Disney special Aladdin on Ice, in which she played Princess Jasmine.

In 2006, Yamaguchi was the host of WE tv series Skating's Next Star, created and produced by Major League Figure Skating. Yamaguchi was a local commentator on figure skating for San Jose TV station KNTV (NBC 11) during the 2006 Winter Olympics.

On May 20, 2008, Yamaguchi became the champion of the sixth season of ABC's reality program Dancing with the Stars, in which she was paired with Mark Ballas, defeating finalist couple Jason Taylor and Edyta Śliwińska. Yamaguchi made a special appearance in the finale of the sixteenth season where she danced alongside Dorothy Hamill.

In 2010, Yamaguchi worked as a daily NBC Olympics skating broadcast analyst on NBC's Universal Sports Network. During the 2010 Winter Olympics, Kristi was also a special correspondent for the Today Show.

In November 2017, Yamaguchi returned to Dancing With the Stars''' 25th season in Week eight, to participate in a trio jazz with Lindsey Stirling and her professional partner Mark Ballas.

 Books 
Yamaguchi authored five books. She released Figure Skating for Dummies in 1997 followed by Always Dream, Pure Gold in 1998. In 2011, she published her award-winning children's book, Dream Big, Little Pig, which was #2 on the New York Times bestseller list and received the Gelett Burgess Children's Book Award. A portion of the proceeds went to the Always Dream Foundation to support early childhood literacy programs. A sequel, It's a Big World Little Pig, was published March 6, 2012. Then, in 2016, came Cara's Kindness which was illustrated by PIxar artist John Lee.

 Fashion 
In early 2012, Yamaguchi created a woman's active wear line focused on function, comfort, and style to empower women to look good and feel good. The lifestyle brand is called Tsu.ya by Kristi Yamaguchi. Tsu.ya donates a portion of its proceeds to support early childhood literacy through Yamaguchi's Always Dream Foundation.

 Philanthropy and supported causes 
In 1996, Yamaguchi established the Always Dream Foundation for children. The goal of the foundation is to provide funding for after school programs, computers, back-to-school clothes for underprivileged children, and summer camps for kids with disabilities. Commenting in 2009, she explained her inspiration for the project: "I was inspired by the Make-A-Wish Foundation to make a positive difference in children’s lives. We’ve been helping out various children’s organizations, which is rewarding. Our latest project is a playground designed so that kids of all abilities can play side by side. That’s our focus now."

Currently, her Always Dream Foundation is focused on early childhood literacy with a statement of "Empowering Children to reach their dreams through education and inspiration." The foundation has partnered with "Raising a Reader" to launch a reading program in schools throughout California and eventually nationwide. It is also providing a language arts program "Footsteps to Brilliance" to students in kindergarten and first grade. Both programs integrate innovative technology into the classrooms.

 Honors and accolades 
Yamaguchi received the Inspiration Award at the 2008 Asian Excellence Awards. Two days after her Dancing with the Stars champion crowning, she received the 2008 Sonja Henie Award from the Professional Skaters Association. Among her other awards are the Thurman Munson Award, Women's Sports Foundation Flo Hyman Award, the Heisman Humanitarian Award, and the Great Sports Legends Award. She is also a member of the U.S. Olympic Committee Olympic Hall of Fame, World Skating Hall of Fame, and the US Figure Skating Hall of Fame.

 Personal life 
On July 8, 2000, she married Bret Hedican, a professional hockey player she met at the 1992 Winter Olympics when he played for Team USA. After their wedding, Yamaguchi and Hedican resided in Raleigh, North Carolina where Hedican played for the Carolina Hurricanes NHL team and won his only Stanley Cup in 2006. He also played for one year with the Anaheim Ducks. They now live in Alamo in northern California with their two daughters, Keara Kiyomi (born 2003) and Emma Yoshiko (born 2005). They also have a summer home on Gull Lake in northern Minnesota.

In 2012, Yamaguchi appeared in a campaign advertisement for presidential candidate Mitt Romney. 

 Competitive highlights 

 Singles 
GP – Event of the ISU Champions Series
 J - Junior level

 Professional 

 Pairs 
(with Rudy Galindo)
GP – Event of the ISU Champions Series
 J - Junior level

 Filmography 

 Bibliography 
 Yamaguchi, Kristi (December 31, 1997). Figure Skating for Dummies. Foster City, CA: IDG Books. . 346 p.
 Yamaguchi, Kristi (April 28, 1998). Always Dream. Dallas: Taylor Publishing Company. 
 Yamaguchi, Kristi (March 1, 2011). Dream Big Little Pig, Naperville, IL: Sourcebooks Jabberwocky. . 32 p.
 Yamaguchi, Kristi (March 1, 2012). It's a Big World, Little Pig!. Naperville, IL: Sourcebooks Jabberwocky. . 32 p.
 Yamaguchi, Kristi (October 4, 2016). Cara's Kindness. Naperville, IL: Sourcebooks Jabberwocky. . 32 p.

 Notes 

 References 
 Nomura, Gail M. (1998). "Japanese American Women," in The Reader's Companion to U.S. Women's History'' (Mankiller, Barbara Smith, ed.). Boston: Houghton Mifflin. ;

Further reading 
 Schwindt, Troy, "Yamaguchi Honored in Thursday Night's U.S. Olympic Hall of Fame Ceremony", US Figure Skating Association, December 8, 2005

External links 

 
 AlwaysDream.org: Yamaguchi's Always Dream Foundation
 
 
 
 

1971 births
American children's writers
American female pair skaters
American female single skaters
American sportspeople of Japanese descent
Dancing with the Stars (American TV series) winners
Figure skaters at the 1992 Winter Olympics
Goodwill Games medalists in figure skating
Living people
Medalists at the 1992 Winter Olympics
Olympic figure skaters of the United States
Olympic gold medalists for the United States in figure skating
Participants in American reality television series
People from Alamo, California
Sportspeople from Hayward, California
Figure skaters from San Jose, California
University of Alberta alumni
World Figure Skating Championships medalists
World Junior Figure Skating Championships medalists
Writers from San Jose, California
Competitors at the 1990 Goodwill Games
American people of Japanese descent
21st-century American women